Vavuniya Muslim Maha Vidyalayam is a national school in Vavuniya, Sri Lanka.

See also
 List of schools in Northern Province, Sri Lanka

References

External links
 Velautham Maha Vidyalayam

National schools in Sri Lanka
Schools in Vavuniya